Sam Easton (born October 4, 1979) is a Canadian actor.

Biography
Easton was born in  Vancouver, British Columbia, Canada. He studied at Humber College, winning the Phil Hartman Comedy Award for best student in 2000  Later that same year he was nominated for the Tim Sims Award.  Easton has had supporting roles in The L Word,  Underclassman, Final Destination 3, and Howie Do It

Filmography

References

External links
 Sammy Easton on ComedyNightLife.com
 

1979 births
Living people
Canadian male film actors
Canadian male television actors
Male actors from Vancouver
21st-century Canadian male actors
Humber College alumni
Place of birth missing (living people)